The Flying Machine is a 2011 3-D  live action/animated film produced by BreakThru Films. The film is directed by Martin Clapp and Geoff Lindsey, and stars Heather Graham and Lang Lang.

Plot
A family takes a journey across the globe on a strange and amazing flying machine, experiencing a series of adventures along the way.

Cast
Heather Graham as Georgie, a single mother who struggles to balance her work and family life.
Lang Lang as himself. He also performs the film's soundtrack.
Kizzy Mee as Jane, Georgie's daughter.
Jamie Munns as Fred, Georgie's son.

Production
The Flying Machine is produced by BreakThru Films and is their first feature-length film to be shot in stereoscopic 3-D. It is the first film to combine live-action and stop-motion in 3-D. It is set to the études of Frédéric Chopin, and is intended to mark his 200th anniversary.  The score was arranged by writer-director Geoff Lindsey and is performed by the film's co-star Lang Lang.

A number of short films were produced alongside the feature, each to be set to one of Chopin's étude. A total of 25 were produced, and were made in a variety of styles and formats, using live-action, stop-motion, and animation.

Short film titles
Opus 10 No. 1 - Transformation
Opus 10 No. 3 - Dad Leaves & Returns
Opus 10 No. 7 - Learning To Fly
Opus 10 No. 9 - London
Opus 25 No. 2 - Chopin's Drawings
Opus 25 No. 5 - Curio Shop
Opus 25 No. 11 - Magic Storm
Opus 25 No. 12 - English Channel
Tristesse - Tristesse
Opus 10 No. 2 - Scarecrow
Opus 10 No. 4 - Pl.Ink
Opus 10 No. 6 - Jumble
Opus 10 No. 8 - Pacific Etude
Opus 10 No. 10 - All Those Days
Opus 10 No. 11 - Hamster Heaven
Opus 10 No. 12 - Little Postman
Opus 25 No. 3 - Behind The Scenes: With The Animators
Opus 25 No. 4 - Spirits of the Flying Machine
Opus 25 No. 7 - Paper Piano
Opus 25 No. 8 - Fat Hamster
Opus 25 No. 9 - Papa's Boy
Opus 25 No. 10 - Night Island

Release
The Flying Machine previewed at the Royal Festival Hall in London on 12 February 2011. It was shown on Sky 3D in 2011, and later released on DVD and Blu-ray.

References

External links
 
 

2011 films
British aviation films
English-language Polish films
British children's adventure films
Polish children's films
2011 3D films
Films with live action and animation
2010s English-language films
2010s British films